Michael V. Pomarico (born July 3, 1955) is an American television soap opera director. He had worked on the ABC-TV daytime drama All My Children for 27 years. He has a wife Mary and two children, Joseph and Jennifer.

Pomarico grew up in Holmdel Township, New Jersey and graduated from Holmdel High School in 1974 as part of its first graduating class.

Positions held
All My Children
 Technical Director (1983–2010)
 Full-time Director (1998–2010)

Awards and nominations
Daytime Emmy Award
Win, 1994, 2002, 2004, 2007, 2008, 2009 Technical Direction, All My Children
Nomination, 1983, 1986, 1994, 1997, 1998, 2000, 2001, 2002, 2003, 2004, 2006, 2007, 2008, 2009 Technical Direction, All My Children
Nomination, 2005, 2008, 2009, 2010 Directing, All My Children
Telly Awards for Producing - Coming Home Again 2007
Telly Award for Editing - Coming Home Again 2007
Telly Award for Editing - The New Rascals 2011

References

External links

American television directors
Living people
1955 births
Holmdel High School alumni
People from Holmdel Township, New Jersey